Y.O Concept is a French racecar constructor based in Cornillé, Brittany. Y.O Concept produces Group CN sportscars under the Funyo brand. Y.O Concept was founded in 1999 by Yves Orhant.

Racing cars

Funyo 4
The Funyo 4 RC and its close relative the Funyo 4 RS are lightweight Group CN sportscars. The car is powered by a 2-liter Peugeot RCC engine. In 2008, 2009 and 2010 this car was the sole model in the V de V Funyo Challenge.

Funyo 5
In 2011 the Funyo 5 was introduced. Updated aerodynamics are some of many improvements. This makes the car approximately 5 seconds a lap faster than the Funyo 4 on a circuit like Circuit de Barcelona-Catalunya. The car is designed to race with the Funyo 4 in the V de V Funyo Challenge.

Funyo 7
The Funyo 7 is a more powerful Group CN / Group R3T sportscar. This car has a more powerful Peugeot EP6DTS turbo engine. This car is designed to compete in various Group CN classes like the SPEED EuroSeries and the V de V Proto Endurance series. The car made its debut in the 2009 V de V Proto Endurance series, driving a partial season entered by Y.O Concept. Two Funyo 7's were entered by HMC Loheac in the same championship in 2010. None of the Funyo 7's appeared in the following years.

References

External links

 Funyo Sportporto
 V de V Funyo Challenge 

Automotive motorsports and performance companies
French racecar constructors
Companies based in Brittany
French companies established in 1999